Carpe Diem is the twenty-third studio album by English heavy metal band Saxon released in 2022.

Background 
In an October 2018 interview with Sonic Perspectives, Byford confirmed that Saxon would "definitely" record a new album sometime in 2019. He was quoted as saying, "We don't have to have too much commitment to timings. We're an established band — we can pretty much do what we want. If we feel like writing, then we write. If we don't feel like writing, then we don't write. Simple as that." Byford had stated that their new album was expected to be released in early 2021; but later sighted a tentative February 2022 release.

Music videos were released for "Carpe Diem (Seize the Day)", "Remember the Fallen", "The Pilgrimage", and "Black Is the Night" on the band's YouTube channel.

Saxon embarked on a UK/European tour with special guests Diamond Head named the Seize the Day tour after the album's opening track, with the UK leg of the tour opening in Ipswich on 11 November and ending on 26 November in London.

Reception 

Carpe Diem was the band's highest-charting record in the United Kingdom since 1983's Power & the Glory, with a top position of 17 on the UK Albums Chart; the record also charted in the United States, reaching number 18 in Top Heatseekers, 26 in Top Current Album Sales, and 63 in Top Album Sales overall.

It was also Saxon's highest-charting album ever in several countries, including Germany, where it reached number 3 on the GfK charts; Switzerland, where the album reached number 4; and Austria, where it reached number 7. Carpe Diem also reached number 4 in the Finnish charts.

The record received positive reviews from critics. Blabbermouth gave the album a rating of 7.5 out of 10, and webzine Metal Storm called it "the most memorable record the band have put out in the last decade or so", commenting that the band are "still going strong" and granting a rating of 7.2.

Track listing

Personnel 
Saxon
 Biff Byford – lead vocals, production
 Paul Quinn – guitars
 Doug Scarratt – guitars
 Nibbs Carter – bass guitar
 Nigel Glockler – drums
 
Additional musicians
 Seb Byford – vocals, engineer
 
Production 
 Andy Sneap – production, mixing, engineer
 Paul Raymond Gregory – album artwork
 Enrique Zabala – booklet design

Charts

References 

2022 albums
Albums produced by Andy Sneap
Saxon (band) albums